Mischief Night refers to an informal holiday on which children and teens engage in pranks and minor vandalism.

Mischief Night may also refer to:
Mischief Night (2006 film), a British comedy-drama film starring Kelli Hollis
Mischief Night (2013 film), a horror/thriller film by Richard Schenkman
Mischief Night (2014 film), an American slasher film by Travis Baker
As Night Comes or Mischief Night, a 2014 film 
"Mischief Night", a song by Wolfpac from Evil Is...